Deception is an Irish prime time television drama airing on TV3. The series, created by Gert Thomas, premiered on Monday 7 January 2013.

Plot
When the small housing estate in the suburbs of Galway was built in 2007 it was exclusive; but not any more. The six families that live there have plenty of secrets, with jealousy, betrayal, revenge, and murder behind every door.

Cast
Vincent Walsh as Andrew Stacey
Nora-Jane Noone as Aoife Stacey
Kris Edlund as Ann Baker
Colm O'Maonlaí as Dara Baker
Danny McColgan as Troy Baker
Conor Mullen as Jack French
Leigh Arnold as Caitríona French
Gavin O'Connor-Duffy as Owen French
Cora Fenton as Colleen Walsh
Roisín O'Neill as Emma Walsh
Eve Mackin as Fiona Woods
Jim Norton as Larry Joyce
Sam Smith as Michael Joyce
Helen Roache as Rose Joyce
Robbie Walsh as Manga
Michael Murphy as Zoo
Jack Harney as Rory
Meabh Coyne as Molly

Production
Deception is TV3's first original series which they are also producing. The six episode first series was filmed on a semi-ghost estate in Galway that already reflected "life in post-Celtic Tiger Ireland." The series cost €1.2 million with half of the funding coming from the Broadcasting Authority of Ireland's Sound and Vision Fund.

Episodes

References

External links 
 
 
 Deception on Facebook

2013 Irish television series debuts
English-language television shows
Irish drama television series
Mystery television series
Television shows set in the Republic of Ireland
Virgin Media Television (Ireland) original programming